Theodor Ludwig Wilhelm von Bischoff  (28 October 1807 in Hannover – 5 December 1882 in Munich) was a German physician and biologist.

Biography 
He lectured on pathological anatomy at Heidelberg (1835-1843) and held professorships in anatomy and physiology at Giessen (1843-1855) and Munich, where he was appointed to the chair of anatomy and physiology in 1854. In 1843, Theodor von Bischoff was elected as member of the German Academy of Sciences.

His most important contributions were made in embryology with a series of four exhaustive memoirs on the development of the mammalian ovum; published in 1842 (rabbit), 1845 (dog), 1852 (guinea pig), and 1854 (roe deer). His studies concerning animal metabolism by measuring urea were less successful, as was his research on the anatomy of skull and brain.

He was elected a foreign member of the Royal Netherlands Academy of Arts and Sciences in 1878.

Selected works 
 Beiträge zur Lehre von den Eyhüllen des menschlichen Fötus, 1834 – Contributions to the study of the human fetus.
 Entwickelungsgeschichte der Säugethiere und des Menschen, 1842 – Developmental history of mammals and man.
 Entwicklungsgeschichte des kaninchen-eies, 1842 – Developmental history of the rabbit ovum.
 Entwicklungsgeschichte des hunde-eies, 1845 – Developmental history of the dog ovum.
 Entwicklungsgeschichte des meerschweinchens, 1852 – Developmental history of the guinea pig.
 Entwicklungsgeschichte des Rehes, 1854 – Developmental history of the roe deer.
 Die Grosshirnwindungen des Menschen : mit Berücksichtigung ihrer Entwicklung bei dem Fötus und ihrer Anordnung bei den Affen, 1868 – The cerebral convolutions of man.
 Das Studium und die Ausübung der Medicin durch Frauen, 1872 – The study and practice of medicine by women.

Notes

References
 

 Bischoff, Theodor Ludwig Wilhelm von (seit 1870) at Deutsche Biographie.

Further reading
 

1807 births
1882 deaths
German anatomists
Academic staff of Heidelberg University
Academic staff of the Ludwig Maximilian University of Munich
German embryologists
German physiologists
Science teachers
Foreign Members of the Royal Society
Corresponding members of the Saint Petersburg Academy of Sciences
Members of the Royal Netherlands Academy of Arts and Sciences
Academic staff of the University of Giessen
Physicians from Hanover
Members of the German Academy of Sciences Leopoldina
Members of the Göttingen Academy of Sciences and Humanities